China National Highway 229 runs from Raohe, Heilongjiang to Gaizhou, Liaoning. It  runs southwest from Raohe towards Gaizhou.

References

229
Transport in Heilongjiang
Transport in Jilin
Transport in Liaoning